is a 2020 action role-playing game developed and published by Square Enix. It is the first in a planned trilogy of games remaking the 1997 PlayStation game Final Fantasy VII. Set in the dystopian cyberpunk metropolis of Midgar, players control the mercenary Cloud Strife. He joins AVALANCHE, an eco-terrorist group trying to stop the powerful mega-corporation Shinra from using the planet's life essence as an energy source. The gameplay combines real-time action with strategic and role-playing elements. Remake was released for the PlayStation 4 in April 2020.

Remake was announced in 2015 following years of speculation. Several key staff members returned, including character designer Tetsuya Nomura as director, director Yoshinori Kitase as producer, scenario writer Kazushige Nojima as story and scenario writer, event planner Motomu Toriyama as a co-director, and composer Nobuo Uematsu who returned to write the main theme. The staff redesigned the characters to balance realism and stylization.

The game received positive reviews, with praise for its graphics, gameplay, narrative, and music. Critics praised the expanded story and the updated battle system for its strategic elements and visual flourishes, but the linearity and repetitive sidequests received criticism. Final Fantasy VII Remake became one of the fastest-selling PlayStation 4 games, selling more than 3.5 million copies within three days and over five million by August 2020. An enhanced version,  was released for the PlayStation 5 and Windows in 2021. A second game, Final Fantasy VII Rebirth, is scheduled for late 2023 or early 2024 for PlayStation 5.

Gameplay

Final Fantasy VII Remake is the first in a planned series of games remaking the 1997 PlayStation game Final Fantasy VII. It covers the first section of the original game, set in the metropolis Midgar.

Players control Cloud Strife, a former Shinra soldier turned mercenary who joins the eco-terrorist group AVALANCHE to fight the Shinra Corporation, who have been draining the planet's life energy. Every element has been remade, using real-time polygonal graphics as opposed to the pre-rendered environments of the original. The story includes major expansions to character development and some notable plot additions.

Exploration and battle mechanics both take place in real-time, like Final Fantasy XV. The game features an altered Active Time Battle (ATB) system from the original, which gradually fills up slowly, or can fill faster with attacks. Once it is filled, the player can halt the action and use special abilities such as magic, items, and special moves. The player can assign these special abilities to shortcut buttons, allowing them to play in real-time without pausing. Each special ability uses up a segment of the ATB bar. The player can switch between party members at any time during battle. Each party member has their own individual skills, such as Cloud's close-quarters melee attacks and Barret's long-range distance attacks. Players are able to use magic and summons of large creatures, and a Limit Break gauge allows characters to perform more powerful attacks once charged. While the game has more real-time elements, strategic elements still remain, such as selecting weapons and magic for each character to wield.

Plot

Cloud Strife (Cody Christian/Takahiro Sakurai) is a former member of SOLDIER, the elite warriors of the Shinra Electric Power Company. Shinra uses Mako, a refined form of the Planet's spiritual energy harvested by massive reactors, to power the metropolis of Midgar and develop cutting-edge technology. Disillusioned with Shinra, and at the request of his childhood friend Tifa Lockhart (Britt Baron/Ayumi Ito), Cloud takes a mercenary job for Avalanche, an eco-terrorist organization, led by Barret Wallace (John Eric Bentley/Masahiro Kobayashi). Barret believes excessive Mako harvesting harms the planet, leading a bombing attack on a Mako reactor. In the aftermath, Cloud is haunted by memories of Sephiroth (Tyler Hoechlin/Toshiyuki Morikawa), an enigmatic former SOLDIER member, and meets the florist Aerith Gainsborough (Briana White/Maaya Sakamoto). Strange ghost-like entities, who alternately help and hinder Cloud throughout the game, cause him to be recruited for another attack, in which he goes missing in action. Cloud meets Aerith again and protects her from Shinra forces. After they reunite with Tifa, the trio learns that Shinra plans to collapse a piece of the "plate" onto the Sector 7 slums. Avalanche fails to stop Shinra's plan, and the plate falls. Aerith helps most of the population and Barret's daughter Marlene evacuate in time, but is captured by Shinra.

Cloud, Tifa, and Barret infiltrate Shinra headquarters and rescue Aerith from being used as an experiment by Shinra scientist Hojo (James Sie/Shigeru Chiba). She reveals that she is the last descendant of the Cetra, a near-extinct precursor race who resided in a "Promised Land", which Shinra covets for its boundless Mako reserves. The group meets a talking wolf-like creature called Red XIII (Max Mittelman/Kappei Yamaguchi), who explains that the ghostly entities are called Whispers. They exist to ensure that the course of destiny is not altered, by correcting any deviations from this course. Meanwhile, Sephiroth infiltrates Shinra and steals a mysterious entity known as "Jenova", connected to the extinction of the Cetra.

In a confrontation at the top of Shinra headquarters, Sephiroth murders the president of Shinra. Shinra's son Rufus (Josh Bowman/Tōru Ōkawa) assumes control of the company and fights Cloud, but is defeated. Cloud and his allies flee the scene via the Midgar Expressway, but find Sephiroth waiting for them at the end. After defeating Whisper Harbinger, an entity formed by an amalgam of Whispers, Cloud's group battles Sephiroth. Sephiroth separates Cloud from the group, asking him to join him and defy fate. Cloud refuses and fights Sephiroth, but is defeated, although Sephiroth spares him and departs. Meanwhile, as Cloud's group leaves Midgar to stop Sephiroth, SOLDIER Zack Fair (Caleb Pierce/Kenichi Suzumura) defeats an army of Shinra forces, and departs with Cloud to Midgar.

Intergrade adds additional ending scenes showing Cloud and his group arriving at the village of Kalm after hitching a ride with Chocobo Bill, and Zack entering the Sector 5 church searching for Aerith.

Intermission
Shortly after the bombing of Mako Reactor 5, Yuffie Kisaragi (Suzie Yeung/Yumi Kakazu), a ninja working for Wutai, arrives at Midgar and meets up with her partner Sonon Kusakabe (Aleks Le/Yoshimasa Hosoya) in order to steal Shinra's "Ultimate Materia". With the help of a local Avalanche cell, Yuffie and Sonon infiltrate the lab under Shinra headquarters and fight through Shinra's forces before discovering that the Ultimate Materia is not yet complete. As they try to escape, they are confronted by a Shinra supersoldier named Nero (Sean Chiplock/Ryōtarō Okiayu). Outmatched, Sonon sacrifices himself to ensure Yuffie can escape. She leaves Shinra headquarters just in time to see the Sector 7 plate fall. Some time later, Yuffie has left Midgar and muses that in order to achieve her desire to see Shinra's downfall, she will need a team to help her.

Development

Background

Final Fantasy VII was developed by Square for the PlayStation console and released in 1997. Its staff included producer, co-writer and series creator Hironobu Sakaguchi, director and co-writer Yoshinori Kitase, artist Yusuke Naora, character designer and co-writer Tetsuya Nomura, and writer Kazushige Nojima. The game was a critical and commercial success, and established the Final Fantasy series as a major franchise. It was expanded through the multimedia project Compilation of Final Fantasy VII, comprising additional games, films, and other media.

In the early 2000s, Square announced a remake for PlayStation 2 alongside Final Fantasy VIII and IX, but nothing further was heard of the project. It was abandoned because of the increased challenge of developing on new hardware and would have necessitated cutting content. The staff were preoccupied with developing Final Fantasy XIII and its sequels, and Remake would have been an equally large or larger project hard to undertake at the same time. Once the XIII series ended, the team was free to pursue other projects. Kitase claims that since XIII, he had been asked multiple times about developing this game. Co-director Naoki Hamaguchi was originally just a fan of the game so he was glad about his inclusion into the core development team.

Demand for a remake grew following a PlayStation 3 tech demo at the 2005 Electronic Entertainment Expo, showcasing the opening of Final Fantasy VII with Square's new Crystal Tools engine. Further demand came during the game's impending tenth anniversary in 2007. On both occasions, Square denied that any remake was in development, for reasons including their focus on new games, the necessity to cut elements to make a remake manageable, the difficulty of developing for modern hardware, and the amount of development time it would require.

The Remake project began when Final Fantasy producer Shinji Hashimoto broached the subject to Kitase, Nojima, and Nomura. All three were reaching a stage of life that they defined as "that age": all felt that if they waited much longer, they might not be alive to or would be too old to develop a remake, and passing the project on to a new generation did not feel right. Another reason for developing the remake was that Square Enix was creating a growing library of PlayStation 4 titles, and the team hoped to increase the console's popularity. Nomura was appointed as director much to his own surprise when it was decided to create the remake but he was busy with the making of the video game Kingdom Hearts III at that time.

Design

The game entered full production by late 2015, led by Business Division 1, an internal production team within Square Enix. While Nomura was involved with the project from the start, he only discovered he was the director after seeing himself credited in an internal company presentation video, as he had expected Kitase to fill the role. Nomura filled the role director for both Final Fantasy VII Remake and Kingdom Hearts III concurrently. Another project leader was Naoki Hamaguchi, who had previously served as a programmer for Lightning Returns: Final Fantasy XIII and project lead for Mobius Final Fantasy. Square Enix approached developing Remake at the same level as a main numbered entry in the Final Fantasy series.

While the team had the option of simply remastering Final Fantasy VII with better graphics as many fans had requested, they noted that its graphics and many of its mechanics had become dated by modern standards. With this in mind, they decided to do a full remake, rebuilding the game systems to suit contemporary tastes and using current gaming technology to recreate the world. An overarching goal of the project was to make the game feel both "new and nostalgic" for players of the original game while exemplifying the idea of Final Fantasy VII for new players. This decision led to the creation of Remake action-based battle system, which draws from that action-based style of Dissidia Final Fantasy. Teruki Endo, who had previously worked on Monster Hunter World, served as battle director. The team aimed to retain all of the gameplay mechanics popular in the original game, including Active Time Battle, while merging them with the action-based system.

Rather than using the character models and graphical style of Advent Children, which by that point had been developed using ten-year-old technology, the team decided to create new designs and models for characters: Nomura wished to balance the realism of Advent Children with cartoon stylization. Nomura was in charge of the revamped main character designs, while designer Roberto Ferrari was in charge of designs for secondary characters. Character modeling was supervised by Visual Works, Square Enix's CGI development branch. Cloud Strife's initial redesign for Final Fantasy VII Remake departed more dramatically from the original's, but was later altered to more closely resemble Nomura's original concept. Tifa Lockhart's original appearance was changed to make her look more realistic as members from the staff realized her design would not fit fight scenes.

Instead of creating a new engine, Square Enix licensed Epic Games' Unreal Engine 4 to develop the game, with Square Enix and Epic Games Japan working together to optimize the engine for Remake. The team received technical assistance from the developers of Kingdom Hearts III, as the latter game was developed using the same engine. The game's lighting is augmented with the lighting engine Enlighten. To help with the action gameplay and video quality, Square Enix originally partnered with video game developer CyberConnect2, with the two companies keeping in close contact due to different development styles.

In 2017, the game's development focus shifted from being developed with external partners to being a primarily internal project. When the company first started the Remake project, the team had to decide the entire scope of the project. There were two directions possible: expand upon the original with multiple releases or include the entire scope of the original game in a single release. The team started to investigate what were the essential parts of the original and what parts are what the fans absolutely had to see; they quickly decided that there were so many parts that are essential and the fans would be upset if the team had to cut out anything. A single release with more depth would not be possible without cutting out parts of the original story. In the end, the team decided the best option for the project was to go for the highest level possible (such as within the city of Midgar, which was mostly inaccessible in the original) with an expanded story in multiple releases. Each game is planned to be on a similar scale to Final Fantasy XIII. The first part focuses on the city of Midgar due to its iconic status among the Final Fantasy community.

Regarding the scope for the first part of the Remake, Nomura mentioned that many were worried about how the company would be able to make a whole game based solely on Midgar, but he didn't think it would be a problem. Nomura said it takes about 7 hours to go through the Midgar section in the original game, going through the same gameplay in the Remake with 3D map in Midgar and new scenario, plus the time it takes to go from one point to another adds up. The overall gameplay of the Remake would be well enough to cover a whole game. The story and scenario writer, Nojima, also added that stopping the game at the end of Midgar would also allow for an adequate amount of story scenarios to be put in as well. Nomura further added that level designs would have to change again after the party leaves Midgar. If the developers were to do that, they would also have to split up other scenarios and even if they add new gameplay, it would have to end in an abrupt point of the story. That's why they felt that if they had everything focused in Midgar, they wouldn't have to split up any of the story elements that happen there.

Scenario
While developing the scenario, the team needed to work carefully, so the game did not appear too nostalgic. They needed to make decisions about what could be carried over from the original and what needed adjustment due to changes in social norms since the original's release. Despite there already being a story in place, which greatly simplified production on some fronts, Nojima was brought back in to create new story material. The scenario for the first part was completed in December 2015, covering the beginning of the game to the escape from Midgar. Kitase observed that despite 23 years passing since the original game was released, the themes of economic inequality, corporate monopoly, and environmentalism were still relevant to the current day. Nomura expressed regret that other areas of Midgar, such as the upper plate, were inaccessible in the original game and wanted to address that in Remake in order to give players a better sense of the city and its culture. The roles of previously minor characters were also expanded for this purpose.

Despite being marketed as a remake, the narrative has multiple changes from the original game, such as Barret being attacked by the antagonist Sephiroth and saved by a Whisper. Sephiroth appears during the Midgar scenario despite not being properly introduced until a flashback Cloud experiences. Vice noted that Cloud sees the future of Aerith in the original 1997 game, leaving her fate unknown to returning fans. Yoshinori Kitase refrained from explaining the reason for the changes from the narrative: "I want to let you know is that all of the lore from the works created after the original game, the [Compilation of Final Fantasy VII], that's all very much in the base of the canon for the remake, and going forward it will be too".

The main characters were adjusted in various ways for Remake. Rather than the "cool and collected" Cloud as seen in other games, Remake depicts his apathetic attitude as a façade to mask his insecurities. Nojima wanted to convey that his standoffishness could be seen as lame. Cloud's initial redesign for Remake departed more dramatically from the original's, but was later altered to more closely resemble Nomura's design. Tifa's desire for revenge against Shinra is complicated by her reluctance to enact violence. Barret's passion and charisma rallies other characters to follow his lead. Nojima worked hard to make the interactions between these three natural. It was important to Hamaguchi to include a scene wherein Cloud has an intimate conversation with one of his teammates based on the player's choices in homage to the "date" scene from the original game. The development team avoided playing favorites between Tifa and Aerith, treating them both as main heroes. In addition to returning characters, the team decided to expand the role of minor characters and write new characters. Cloud's interactions with AVALANCHE members Biggs, Wedge, and Jessie further his character development and deepen the world of the story. Sephiroth was initially intended to be a looming presence, inspired by the shark in Jaws, to mirror his role in this section of the original game. However, Kitase reasoned that the original's Jaws-like approach would be ineffective because even new players were too familiar with the character. Hamaguchi pitched an alternate ending in which Cloud faces off with Sephiroth, which led to him appearing more and more in the remake.

The game is fully voiced, with the original plan being for the voice actors from the CGI film Final Fantasy VII: Advent Children to reprise their roles. Ultimately, the English characters were recast for Remake. According to Kitase, choosing a new generation of voices for the characters was part of the game's rebirth as Remake. The Japanese voice actors remained the same with Takahiro Sakurai being surprised by this younger take on Cloud, having not played Cloud in the original unvoiced PlayStation video game. For the English dub, Cody Christian commented on replacing Steve Burton voicing Cloud, stating, "Steve, you paved the way. You made this character what it is and have contributed in shaping a legacy" and thus wanted to not let Burton down with his take on the character. John Eric Bentley voiced Barret, a character he admired when he played the 1997 game. He felt his familiarity with the original work improved his performance, aided by the translators who explained the context for his scenes. He wanted his portrayal of Barret to be multifaceted and serve as a positive example of Black representation in games. Briana White (Aerith) studied Maaya Sakamoto's acting in order to appeal to fans. Meanwhile, Britt Baron had little knowledge of Tifa when being cast, but grew to like her character. Other prominent actors include Erica Lindbeck (Jessie), Gideon Emery (Biggs), and Matt Jones (Wedge). The game employs an algorithm to adjust characters' facial motions while speaking in order to automatically match lip syncing and emotion in every language.

Music

The game's soundtrack consists primarily of arrangements of pieces Nobuo Uematsu wrote for the original Final Fantasy VII, with original tracks by several other series veterans, such as Masashi Hamauzu and Mitsuto Suzuki. Uematsu contributed one new track: the theme song for the game, "Hollow". It was the first time Uematsu and Kitase had worked together since Final Fantasy X (2001), with Kitase initially believing Uematsu would refuse as he had long since left Square Enix and found success as an independent composer. Nomura intended "Hollow" to reflect Cloud's state of mind; he wanted it to be a rock song with male vocals and an image of "rain". It was performed by Yosh, the vocalist for Survive Said the Prophet. Hamauzu also expressed honor in doing the music alongside Uematsu, as the original game was his first exposure to the series. Suzuki stated that the themes for Wall Market, Honeybee Inn, and Midgar Highway were among his favorite contributions.

Remake employs adaptive music in its gameplay wherein multiple arrangements of a particular track are played simultaneously, which fade in and out with the player's actions, such as entering or exiting a battle. Arrangements also shift within a battle depending on the emotions the developers wanted players to experience from moment to moment. Because cutscenes in Remake have voiced dialogue, the sound team needed to rearrange some tracks to accommodate this change but they were careful to preserve the original melodies.

Release

Following years of rumors and fan requests, Final Fantasy VII Remake was announced during Sony's conference at E3 2015. Visual Works created the announcement trailer. Square Enix's stock prices rose to their highest rating since November 2008, and the YouTube release of the reveal trailer garnered over 10 million views in the following two weeks. The game was next showcased at the 2015 PlayStation Experience, demonstrating cutscenes and gameplay from the opening sequence.

During the Final Fantasy 30th anniversary opening ceremony event hosted by Square Enix in Tokyo on January 31, 2017 – the 20th anniversary of Final Fantasy VII — the game's first piece of CGI key art was unveiled, along with announcements for a collaboration event with Mobius Final Fantasy. On February 18, Nomura revealed two screenshots, showing off the updated HUD. Due to its lack of footage since 2015, switch to internal development, and other projects Nomura was involved in, there were concerns about the status of the project. Speaking following E3 2018, Nomura stated that the game was in development, with his full attention shifted to it when Kingdom Hearts III was completed.

After years without substantial footage, a teaser trailer was shown during PlayStation's May 2019 State of Play broadcast. Kitase revealed that the team wanted to "try something new" on the State of Play broadcast by showing the trailer. The release date, March 3, 2020, was revealed the following month in a second teaser trailer during an orchestral concert dedicated to the music of Final Fantasy VII in Los Angeles. Further release details were announced at the company's E3 2019 press conference, including different editions of Remake. Kitase later clarified at the event that Square Enix had yet to determine the number of games in the Remake series, adding that they were in the process of planning the second installment.

An extended gameplay showcase and demo was playable at E3 2019, demonstrating parts of the opening mission, including some of the exploration, combat system, and first boss battle. The playable demo received positive reception in early previews, with praise towards the graphics, gameplay and combat system. It won three awards at the Game Critics Awards for Best of Show, Best Console Game, and Best Role-Playing Game, as well as the best looking Unreal Engine game at E3 2019. Extended footage of the demo, as well as an additional trailer, was featured at the 2019 Tokyo Game Show. Final Fantasy VII Remake was initially PlayStation 4 exclusive until 2021, with no further details about its release on other platforms at the time. The release date was pushed back from March 3 to April 10, 2020. A demo was released on the PlayStation Store on March 2, 2020, covering the first chapter.

In March 2020, Square Enix revealed that Europe and Australia would receive physical copies of Final Fantasy VII Remake early, due to growing concerns of the effect of the COVID-19 pandemic on distribution. This did not apply to downloads, as they were not directly affected by the global supply chain. Artwork of Cloud was used on buildings in Los Angeles to promote the game.

The same year in June, a scene from Final Fantasy VII Remake was reproduced for the 8-bit NEC PC-88 computer by Japanese programmer Soba P.

An upgraded version of Remake for the PlayStation 5, titled Final Fantasy VII Remake Intergrade, was released on June 10, 2021, featuring improved visuals and shorter load times, available at no additional cost to owners of the PS4 version. It includes a PS5-exclusive DLC expansion titled Episode Intermission featuring the playable character Yuffie Kisaragi, who does not appear in the Midgar segment of the original game. The DLC expansion is included with the purchase of Intergrade, but must be purchased separately if using the free upgrade from the PS4 version. Intergrade adds the ability to use traditional turn-based controls while in the game's normal difficulty mode, a photo mode, and better overall performance in framerate and resolution.

In May 2021, news outlets reported that Square Enix was in the midst of making a Final Fantasy VII anime series in partnership with Netflix. No release date was mentioned in the reports.

A port of Intergrade was released for Windows on December 16, 2021, via the Epic Games Store. While anticipation was high, the port was heavily criticised by players and critics alike due to lacklustre setting customisation and severe stuttering, both stemming from a lack of optimisation. It was released on Steam on June 17, 2022. A novel focused on the backstories of Tifa and Aerith titled Final Fantasy VII Remake: Traces of Two Pasts was also published by Square.

Remake is the first in a planned trilogy of games remaking Final Fantasy VII; the second part, Final Fantasy VII Rebirth, is planned for late 2023 or early 2024. In addition, Crisis Core: Final Fantasy VII Reunion, a remaster of Crisis Core: Final Fantasy VII, which was released in December 2022, is considered a prequel to the larger Final Fantasy VII Remake project.

Music from Remake was also included as playable in Theatrhythm Final Bar Line, the 2023 installment in Square's Theatrhythm rhythm game series. Theatrhythm had previously included music from the original Final Fantasy VII, Advent Children and Crisis Core, which also returns in Final Bar Line.

Reception

Critical response

Final Fantasy VII Remake received "generally favorable" reviews, according to review aggregator Metacritic, with critics praising its faithfulness to the original game. Tamoor Hussain of GameSpot states that, while Remake is only the initial entry in a full reimagining of the original game, it is rich in details that were previously unexplored, realizes new storytelling ambitions with confidence, and presents fresh perspectives that feel both meaningful and essential in his review. To summarize, he says that the game tells a smaller, more personal Final Fantasy VII tale and marries it with a smart mashup of action and RPG gameplay in order to deliver a must-play experience. Tom Marks of IGN calls the game a "complete reinvention", praising the combat system. Nahila Bonfiglio of The Daily Dot regarded it as one of the best games of 2020 based on multiple aspects that would appeal to the audience. EGM claimed the game was captivating like the original. Eurogamer also highly regarded the remake, to the point of finding it superior to the original title.

The narrative was praised for the characters and their arcs. IGN called its "story fleshed out with real emotional arcs", praising its nostalgic feel, while criticizing the game for having "filler" and sometimes convoluted new plot points and side missions, but concluding that the remake brings a new life into a classic while standing as a great RPG on its own. Shacknews wrote that the story in the remake is one of the strongest ever achieved by the company. In general the voiceactors were well received, with Cody Christian's performance as Cloud standing out as he enhances his character arc. His interactions with the cast and the expansion of the minor characters in Avalanche was also well received by writers with his confrontations with Sephiroth Destructoid agreed about the cast, most notably Aerith, noting her fun characterization. The handling of the city of Midgar and expansion of minor characters were praised by the media too.

Critical response to the new combat has been positive, partly due to the strategy needed and the distinctive fighting style of each playable character, such as Cloud wielding a sword, in contrast to Barret's shooting from afar. GamesRadar also praised the combat for the strategy required, due to each enemy having a weakness, and the variety among the characters thanks to their unique traits. RPGamer praised both the return of Materia used to provide magic attacks and the addition of upgradeable weapons in order to let players decide which equipment they want to use. RPGamer felt that Remake relied on "padding" to expand on the areas of the game, which they considered linear for the genre. GamesRadar criticized some of the sidequests in the game as lackluster though the interactions were better received. EGM claimed that some quests had too much padding, citing an example where the player has to constantly change the playable character to open multiple doors in the Shinra headquarters. Easy Allies said that despite the linear gameplay, the reviewers finished the game in 38 hours, and still had plenty of quests left to complete. 

In regards to Integrade, Siliconera praised the focus on Yuffie's story even if she comes across as annoying due to her younger personality but felt her relationship with Sonon improved it. Besides the new minigame, Siliconera praised the improved graphics from Integrade. Enjoying the option of playing directly with the sidestory, Destructoid found Yuffie instead likable to the point of coming across as realistic and enjoyed her own style of gameplay. GameSpot gave it a perfect score, also finding the graphics superior, most notably due to its framerate, fitting for a PlayStation 5 game which is more notable when Cloud becomes involved in fights. PC Invasion also praised the framerate, making the PC version highly recommendable to play rather than the other ones.

Sales
Final Fantasy VII Remake sold over 3.5 million copies worldwide within three days. This made it one of the biggest launches for a PlayStation4 game and the fastest-selling PS4 exclusive, surpassing the launch sales of Marvel's Spider-Man (3.3million; 2018) and God of War (3.1million; 2018).

In Japan, Final Fantasy VII Remake sold over a million copies during its first week, with the game sold out in many stores.

In North America, Remake was the top-selling game of April 2020 and the third best-selling game of 2020, behind Call of Duty: Modern Warfare (2019) and Animal Crossing: New Horizons (2020). It became the fastest-selling Final Fantasy title in the franchise's history, surpassing the launch record previously set by Final Fantasy XV (2016), and was the most downloaded PlayStation 4 game of April 2020 in the United States.

In the United Kingdom, the game debuted at the top of the weekly sales chart, selling an estimated 60,000 physical copies in its first weekend. German trade association GAME announced that it took Final Fantasy VII Remake only a few days to sell more than 100,000 units within Germany, for which it won a Gold Sales Award. It was the fourth most downloaded PlayStation 4 game of April 2020 in Europe. Integrade accumulated 13.803 players upon it release in Steam.

Awards
Final Fantasy VII Remake won the overall "Game of Show award" from E3 2019. After its release, the game also won the Editors' Choice awards from PlayStation. In the CEDEC Awards, the game won in the "Excellency Award for Sound" category. It was later nominated for six awards at The Game Awards, including Game of the Year. It won in the two categories "Best RPG" and "Best Score/Music". It also won IGN Japan's Game of the Year in 2020. Both Anime News Network and Siliconera and RPG Site also listed it as one of the best games from its year. Final Fantasy VII Remake also won the "Soundtrack Album of the Year" award at the 35th Japan Gold Disc Award, and the "Role-Playing Game of the Year" at the 24th Annual D.I.C.E. Awards. The game also won best soundtrack at the 2022 Steam Awards.

Further reading

Notes

References

External links
 
 Intergrade official website
 

2020 video games
Action role-playing video games
Biopunk
Climate change in fiction
Cyberpunk video games
Dystopian video games
Eco-terrorism in fiction
Environmental mass media
Final Fantasy video games
Final Fantasy VII
The Game Awards winners
Interactive Achievement Award winners
Japanese role-playing video games
Neo-noir video games
PlayStation 4 games
PlayStation 4 Pro enhanced games
PlayStation 5 games
Role-playing video games
Science fiction video games
Single-player video games
Terrorism in fiction
Unreal Engine games
Video game remakes
Video games developed in Japan
Video games directed by Tetsuya Nomura
Video games scored by Masashi Hamauzu
Video games scored by Nobuo Uematsu
Video games scored by Yasunori Nishiki
Video games set on fictional planets
D.I.C.E. Award for Role-Playing Game of the Year winners